Bolshye Yasyrki is a rural locality (a selo) in Rubashevskoye Rural Settlement, Anninsky District, Voronezh Oblast, Russia. The population was 646 as of 2010. There are 10 streets.

Geography 
Bolshye Yasyrki is located on the Bityug River, 22 km north of Anna (the district's administrative centre) by road. Mosolovka is the nearest rural locality.

References 

Rural localities in Anninsky District